The Medic can refer to:

 The Medic (1916 film), a 1916 Hungarian film
 The Medic (1979 film), a 1979 French film
 The Medic, a playable class in Team Fortress 2